Zhou Yuan (born 15 December 1982 in Handan) is a retired Chinese volleyball player who plays for Guangdong Evergrande.

Clubs
  Shandong (2000–2001)
  Zhejiang  (2001–2002)
  Hebei (2002–2003)
  Jiangsu  (2003–2004)
  Nanjing Force (2004–2005)
  Bayi (Army) (2005)
  Guangdong Evergrande (2009-2013)

Awards

Individuals
 2013 Asian Women's Club Volleyball Championship "Best Spiker"
 2013 Asian Women's Club Volleyball Championship "Best Server"

Clubs
 2010-2011 Chinese Volleyball League  —  Runner-up, with Guangdong Evergrande
 2011-2012 Chinese Volleyball League  —  Champion, with Guangdong Evergrande
 2013 Asian Club Championship -  Champion, with Guangdong Evergrande

References

Chinese women's volleyball players
Living people
1982 births
Volleyball players from Hebei
Sportspeople from Handan
Outside hitters
21st-century Chinese women